Eric Paul Whitaker (born January 24, 1957) is an American diplomat and career member of the Senior Foreign Service who served as the United States Ambassador to Niger from 2018 to 2021. He was sworn in on December 15, 2017 and presented his credentials to President Mahamadou Issoufou on January 26, 2018. He left office in December 1, 2021.

Early life and education
Whitaker has a BS in biology and an MS in community health education from the University of Illinois, a Master of Public Administration degree from the University of Pittsburgh, and a Master of Public Policy degree from the Wilson School at Princeton University.

Career
Whitaker has served as an American diplomat since 1990, including a tenure as the Acting Deputy Assistant Secretary for East Africa and the Sudans in the Bureau of African Affairs at the United States Department of State. A two-time deputy chief of mission, he has served at U.S. embassies in ten African countries and was a Peace Corps volunteer in the Philippines.

Whitaker has a BS in biology and an MS in community health education from the University of Illinois, a Master of Public Administration degree from the University of Pittsburgh, and a Master of Public Policy degree from the Wilson School at Princeton University.

Personal life
Whitaker speaks Spanish, Portuguese, French, Visayan, and Korean.

References

Living people
University of Illinois Urbana-Champaign alumni
University of Pittsburgh alumni
Princeton School of Public and International Affairs alumni
Trump administration personnel
Peace Corps volunteers
Ambassadors of the United States to Niger
United States Foreign Service personnel
1957 births
21st-century American diplomats